Nekrasovo is a rural locality (a village) in Chertkovskoye Rural Settlement, Selivanovsky District, Vladimir Oblast, Russia. The population was 10 as of 2010.

Geography 
Nekrasovo is located 11 km northeast of Krasnaya Gorbatka (the district's administrative centre) by road. Voshchikha is the nearest rural locality.

References 

Rural localities in Selivanovsky District